AACF may refer to:

 Arkansas Advocates for Children and Families, an organization which encourages public policy in Arkansas that will benefit children and their families
 Asian American Christian Fellowship, a Christian college ministry with affiliations to the Japanese Evangelical Missionary Society